Now Deh is a village in Vilkij-e Shomali Rural District, in the Central District of Namin County, Ardabil Province, Iran. At the 2006 census, its population was 63, in 20 families.

References 

Towns and villages in Namin County